The Equalizer is an American crime drama television series that premiered on CBS on February 7, 2021. It is the second reboot in the franchise, following the 2014 film and its 2018 and 2023 sequels, and is a reboot of the 1980s series with the same name.

The series is co-created by executive producers Richard Lindheim, with Michael Sloan, and Queen Latifah, who also stars as the title character. John Davis, John Fox, Debra Martin Chase, Andrew Marlowe, and Terri Miller also serve as executive producers. Lindheim died from heart failure on January 18, 2021, while working on the series; the series premiere is dedicated to his memory.

In March 2021, the series was renewed for a second season which premiered on October 10, 2021. In May 2022, the series was renewed for its third and fourth seasons. The third season premiered on October 2, 2022.

Premise
"The series centers around Robyn McCall, an enigmatic woman in New York City and single mother to teenage daughter Delilah with a mysterious background who uses her extensive skills to help those with nowhere else to turn, acting as a guardian angel and a defender for those who cannot defend themselves while pursuing her own redemption."

Cast

Main
 Queen Latifah as Robyn McCall,  "the Equalizer", a divorced single mother and former CIA operative who acts as a street vigilante for justice
 Tory Kittles as Marcus Dante, a divorced father of two sons and an intelligent and shrewd NYPD detective on Robyn's trail because he is reluctant to have Robyn help him but finds common ground in getting justice. In season 2, they become allies and friends.
 Adam Goldberg as Harry Keshegian, Melody's husband and a master hacker who faked his death with Robyn's help
 Liza Lapira as Melody "Mel" Bayani, a former U.S. Air Force sniper turned owner of a bar that acts as a secret base of operations and an old friend of Robyn's from her service days
 Laya DeLeon Hayes as Delilah, Robyn's 15-year-old daughter, who is rebellious and feels neglected by Robyn, despite their attempts to bond with each other
 Lorraine Toussaint as Viola "Aunt Vi" Marsette, Robyn's wise paternal aunt, who lives with Robyn and Delilah, having moved from Milwaukee to help them out, and is an artist.
 Chris Noth as William Bishop (seasons 1–2), a quirky ex–CIA director and old friend of Robyn's who now runs his own private security company. He acts as liaison between Robyn and the CIA. In season 2, he is killed in a plane crash by Robyn's nemesis, Mason Quinn.

Recurring

 Erica Camarano as Detective Paley (season 1; guest season 2), who works with Dante. She is shot and killed in the second-season premiere while responding to a bank robbery along with Dante.
 Jennifer Ferrin as Avery Grafton, a district attorney who has made Robyn's arrest and prosecution a priority for her office, seeing her as an embarrassment for the justice system and a threat to her re-election prospects. In the second season, after Robyn saves Grafton from an assassination attempt by a corrupt A.D.A. and a known career criminal - trying to stop a probe into her office that would have exposed them both - and points out the blindspots that both she and her office have developed in their pursuit of justice, she decides to call off the manhunt, as long as Robyn does not cross the line too far.   
 Frank Pando as Captain Torres, Dante's commanding officer
 Dominic Fumusa as Detective Ken Mallory (season 2), a detective recruited by D.A. Grafton to identify and arrest Robyn
 Brett Dalton as Carter Griffin (season 2–present)

Special guest stars
 Jada Pinkett Smith as Jessie "The Worm" Cook (season 2), a former colleague of Robyn's who is a professional thief
 Donal Logue as Colton Fisk (season 3)

Notable guest stars
 Gloria Reuben as Trish (season 3)
 Kelly Rowland as Misty (season 3)

Episodes

Series overview

Season 1 (2021)

Season 2 (2021–22)

Season 3 (2022–23)

Production

Development
In November 2019, CBS announced that a reboot was in development with Queen Latifah in the lead role as Robyn McCall. Andrew Marlowe and Terri Miller would serve as showrunners with Latifah herself as an executive producer. On January 27, 2020, CBS issued a pilot order for the new version. Production companies involved with the pilot include Flavor Unit, Davis Entertainment, Martin Chase Productions and CBS Television Studios and Universal Television. On May 8, 2020, it was announced that the production had been given a series order. On March 9, 2021, CBS renewed the series for a second season. On May 1, 2022, Terri Edda Miller and Andrew W. Marlowe stepped down as showrunners and are being replaced by Joseph C. Wilson and Adam Glass.

On May 5, 2022, CBS renewed the series for its third and fourth seasons.

Casting
In February 2020, it was announced that Liza Lapira and Lorraine Toussaint had been cast in the pilot's lead roles. On March 3, 2020, it was announced that Tory Kittles joined the cast in a starring role. On May 8, 2020, it was announced that Chris Noth joined a starring role along with Latifah. On December 21, 2021, CBS and Universal Television announced Noth was terminated from the series after sexual assault allegations were made against him. His final appearance was in the middle of the second season. On January 3, 2022, it was reported that Noth had made his last appearance in "Separated" due to allegations that he assaulted women in December 2021. On September 20, 2022, it was announced that Donal Logue and Gloria Reuben joined the cast in undisclosed capacities for the third season.

Filming
The pilot was slated to film in New York City in March 2020. Production was delayed as a direct result of the COVID-19 pandemic in the United States before filming could begin. On February 9, 2021, it was reported that production had been temporarily suspended due to a positive COVID-19 test.

Filming for the series has taken place in several locations in northern New Jersey, including Paterson, Newark, and Jersey City. Exterior shots of a Jersey City home are used for Robyn McCall's residence.

Broadcast
The Equalizer premiered on February 7, 2021, after Super Bowl LV on CBS. The second season premiered on October 10, 2021. The third season premiered on October 2, 2022.

The series had its series premiere in Germany on Sky One on July 12, 2021, in the UK on Sky Witness on August 3, 2021, and in Italy on Sky Investigation (local version of Sky Witness) on October 3, 2021.

Marketing
On May 19, 2020, a 30-second teaser featuring Queen Latifah explaining her involvement in the series was released by CBS. On January 9, 2021, CBS released the first official teaser for the series.

Reception

Critical response

On Rotten Tomatoes, the series has an approval rating of 67% based on reviews from 30 critics, with an average rating of 6/10. The website's critical consensus states, "Queen Latifah returns to the small screen in full command of her craft—if only The Equalizer overly-engineered early episodes were on her level." On Metacritic, it has a weighted average score of 57 out of 100, based on 15 critics, indicating "mixed or average reviews".

Ratings

Overall

Season 1

Season 2

Season 3

Future

In January 2021, when asked about the show's relationship to the film series starring Denzel Washington, Marlowe stated that while they are focusing on establishing the television series to stand on its own, they are leaving the opportunity open for a crossover between the two in the future.

References

External links
 
 

2021 American television series debuts
2020s American crime drama television series
2020s American mystery television series
American action adventure television series
American detective television series
American spy thriller television series
CBS original programming
English-language television shows
The Equalizer
Espionage television series
Fictional secret agents and spies
Fictional vigilantes
Super Bowl lead-out shows
Television productions postponed due to the COVID-19 pandemic
Television series about families
Television series by CBS Studios
Television series by Universal Television
Television series reboots
Television shows filmed in New Jersey
Television shows filmed in New York (state)
Television shows set in New York City
Vigilante television series
Fictional portrayals of the New York City Police Department
Works about the Serbian Mafia